Fouman may refer to:
 Fuman County, a county in Gilan Province, Iran
 Fuman, Iran, a city in Gilan Province, Iran